Neuroterus anthracinus is a widely distributed gall wasp that forms chemically induced leaf galls on oak trees. N. anthracinus has both sexual and agamic generations and in consequence forms two distinct galls, the oyster gall and April-bud gall.

Synonyms
Ameristus Förster 1869, Diplobius Kinsey 1923, Dolichostrophus Ashmead 1887, Neospathogaster Kinsey 1923, Spathegaster Hartig 1840, furunculus Beyerinck 1882, ostreus Giraud 1859, ostria Hartig 1840, Andricus ostreus, Neuroterus schlechtendali and Andricus furunculus are all previous nomenclatures found in the literature.

Galls

The oyster gall is found  on the leaf underside, rarely above, and is around 0.3 cm across, located between the midrib and the lateral veins. It develops under the lower epidermis and when it emerges it has two flaps of valve-like tissue which remain, even after the gall has fallen. The gall has also been recorded as green, brown, pink and even with red spots.

The April-bud gall is of brief duration, the bud swelling and the insect emerging within a week from the smooth and oval 0.8 cm gall, tucked up within the bud scales. The old galls show the escape aperture clearly.

Life cycle

Agamic generation
Emerging in autumn the parthenogenetic female of the agamic generation developed in the unilocular and unilarval bean-shaped structure, which is about 0.8 cm across, known as the 'oyster gall'; they lay eggs within the buds which result in the bisexual generation.

Sexual generation
The males and females emerge from the unilocular and unilarval April-bud galls in the terminal or axillary buds around May; their fertilised eggs placed in the leaf lamina result in the Oyster gall.

Parasites and inquilines
Several parasites and inquilines are found in both the sexual and agamic phases.

See also
 Neuroterus quercusbaccarum
 Neuroterus numismalis
 Neuroterus albipes
 Oak marble gall
 Oak apple
 Oak artichoke gall

References
Notes

Sources
 Darlington, Arnold (1975) The Pocket Encyclopaedia of Plant Galls in Colour. Pub. Blandford Press. Poole. .
 Stubbs, F. B. Edit. (1986) Provisional Keys to British Plant Galls. Pub. Brit Plant Gall Soc. .

External links
Checklist of Cynipid wasps

Cynipidae
Gall-inducing insects
Hymenoptera of Europe
Insects described in 1838
Oak galls
Taxa named by John Curtis